The Eyre Peninsula Railway is a  gauge railway on the Eyre Peninsula of South Australia. Radiating out from the ports at Port Lincoln and Thevenard, it is isolated from the rest of the South Australian railway network. Peaking at 777 kilometres in 1950, today only a 60 kilometre section remains open. It is currently operated by Aurizon.

History

The Eyre Peninsula Railway was built and operated by the South Australian Railways (SAR). As with many other early narrow-gauge railways in South Australia, the Eyre Peninsula lines started out as isolated lines connecting small ports to the inland, opening up the country for settlement and economic life including export of grain and other produce in an environment with few roads and only horse-drawn road vehicles. The railway has always been isolated from the main network. A proposal to link it with the rest of the network at Port Augusta was rejected in the 1920s and again in the 1950s.

The first 67 kilometres from Port Lincoln to Cummins opened on 18 November 1907, followed by extensions to Yeelanna on 1 April 1909, Minnipa on 5 May 1913, Nunjikompita on 14 August 1914 and Thevenard on 8 February 1915, a total of 434 kilometres. A second line opened from Cummins to Moody on 1 August 1912, being extended to Ungarra on 31 March 1913, Kimba on 11 July 1913 and Buckleboo on 5 August 1926, a distance of 213 kilometres.

Branch lines off the original line opened from Yeelanna to Mount Hope on 9 October 1914, a distance of 38 kilometres and from Wandana to Penong on 7 February 1924, a distance of 83 kilometres. A further nine kilometre branch from Kevin to Kowulka opened on 11 April 1950. This was the peak of the network's size at 777 kilometres.

The Mount Hope line was truncated by 15 kilometres on 12 July 1965, with Kapinnie becoming its terminus. The remaining section closed in October 2002.

The original route for gypsum traffic had followed a circuitous,  route, via Kowulka and Wandana, from the mine at Kevin to the port at Thevenard. The ruling grade was 1 in 80. In 1966, a  line with a ruling grade of 1 in 120 was opened from Kevin to Penong Junction. The line from Wandana to Kowulka was closed. In 1984 the Thevenard unloading facility was upgraded with a balloon loop.

The Eyre Peninsula Railway was included in the March 1978 takeover of the SAR by Australian National and the November 1997 sale of Australian National's South Australian freight business to Genesee & Wyoming which included a 50-year lease on the rail network from the state government until 2047.

The last grain train from Kevin to Penong operated on 3 March 1997 with the line reverting to state government ownership on 30 June 2001. Due to a poor harvest resulting from drought, the last grain train north of Cummins to Kimba ran on 20 December 2018.

Grain trains ceased operating in May 2019, with Viterra moving its business to road haulage with much of the network closed. The network technically remains open as no lines have formally been 'closed'. However, from an operational standpoint, the lines are closed. Since April 2005, grain trains had only operated from Port Lincoln to Wudinna and Kimba. The workshops in Port Lincoln initially remained open for ongoing railway wagon maintenance brought in by road from Whyalla and Thevenard, but the workshops have since closed with equipment transferred to Adelaide for use at the Motive Power Centre. The maintenance is now done at the Progress Rail Port Augusta workshops, resulting in rollingstock being transferred there via road.

The Wudinna to Penong Junction section remained open to facilitate rolling stock movements to and from the Port Lincoln workshops. Gypsum trains continue to operate from the Lake MacDonnell mine at Kevin to Thevenard for Gypsum Resources Australia, a joint venture between Boral and CSR. A final light engine movement from Port Lincoln to Thevenard ran on 26 June 2019.

Operation of the Eyre Peninsula Railway was acquired by Aurizon in their purchase of One Rail Australia (previously Genesee & Wyoming Australia); the sale was finalised on 29 July 2022.

On the 3rd of March 2023, Aurizon and Viterra submitted a formal application to the Australian Federal Government for A$220 million in funding to repair and upgrade the Eyre Peninsula network. The proposal includes re-opening the Port Lincoln-Wudinna and Cummins-Kimba lines, upgrades to the outloading facilities at Viterra’s Lock,  Wudinna, Cummins, Kimba and Rudall sites with a target of at least 1.3mt of grain to be hauled by rail per year. Aurizon and Viterra plan to have the network reopened within 12 months if funding is approved.

Lines

Services

Freight
Since June 2019, the Eyre Peninsula Railway only carries gypsum traffic with three returns services running daily. In 2017, 1.55 million tonnes of gypsum was transported. Until 2019, grain traffic was dominant on the division since the 1970's. Previously livestock, oil, salt, superphosphate and water was carried on both dedicated freight and mixed trains.

Passenger
Initially passengers were conveyed on mixed trains. A weekly passenger service from Port Lincoln to Thevenard was introduced in 1923 that included a sleeping car. It operated as a boat train being positioned at the foot of the jetty at Port Lincoln to connect with ships from Adelaide. In 1931 Fageol railbuses converted from motor buses were introduced, these were supplemented by Brill 75s in 1936. The last service was withdrawn on 30 August 1968.

Motive Power & Rolling stock
The Eyre Peninsula Railway was initially operated by T, V, W and Y class steam locomotives. All had previously been used on other parts of the SAR network. These were replaced by 830 class diesel locomotives in the 1960s, some of which have never left the division. Nine were delivered new to the Eyre Peninsula Railway, while others were transferred from the Port Pirie to Broken Hill line after it was converted to standard gauge replacing the last remaining T class steam locomotives in April 1970.

Some 830s were transferred to AN Tasrail in the early 1980s and replaced by ex Commonwealth Railways NT and NJ class locomotives made redundant by the closure of the Central Australia Railway, the use of the NT class locomotives wasn't successful and both were cut up at Port Lincoln. As of January 2019, the locomotive fleet comprised seven 830's (including three rebuilt as 900s), three NJ's and two ex Australian Railroad Group As locomotives classified as the 1200 class. As of January 2023, The Thevenard based locomotive fleet is worked by two NJ's, the two 1200's and a handful of operational 830/900 class units. 

Rolling stock was maintained under contract by Clyde Engineering and Downer Rail from 1997 until brought back in house in 2014. The infrastructure was maintained by Broadspectrum.

Depots

When the line opened, a depot was established at Cummins with locomotives sent to Islington Railway Workshops in Adelaide for major work. From 1931 the railway was able to handle all level of repairs with the establishment of a workshop at Port Lincoln with a roundhouse opened in 1934. The workshop was rebuilt in 1966 to service diesel locomotives.

As well as maintaining the Eyre Peninsula fleet, in later years Downer Rail used the Port Lincoln depot for external work including rebuilding five Queensland Rail 2100s for further use with Australian Railroad Group, and 830s, CKs and DAs for the Whyalla Steelworks network. In 2019, the locomotive depot was nominated for inclusion on the South Australian Heritage Register. As of December 2019, the locomotive workshops and roundhouse have been provisionally listed on the register.

A locomotive shed was also established at Thevenard and replaced by a small locomotive servicing facility in 1992. With the closure of the grain network, the Thevenard facility was expected to be upgraded when the Port Lincoln depot closed. As of December 2019, the Port Lincoln Workshops remained open for re-skinning wagon interiors brought in by road from the nearby BHP Whyalla Tramway.

See also

Railway stations on the Eyre Peninsula

Notes

References

Further reading

External links

Peninsula Pioneer website – dedicated to the history of the railways of Eyre Peninsula

Eyre Peninsula
Railway lines in South Australia
Railway lines opened in 1907
1907 establishments in Australia
3 ft 6 in gauge railways in Australia